Claw, in comics, may refer to:

 Claw (Lev Gleason Publications)
 Claw the Unconquered, a DC Comics character
 Claw (John Chan), a DC Comics character
 Claw (Gargoyles), a character from the Gargoyles animated series and spin-off comic
 Claw, also known as Ironclaw, from The Legendaries whose name in the original french is Gryf (Gryfenfer)

It may also refer to:

 Cat Claw, a Malibu Comics character
 Claws (comics), a Marvel Comics mini-series
 Crimson Claw, a First Comics character
 Dark Claw, an Amalgam Comics character
 Dragon's Claws, a Marvel UK team and series
 Ripclaw, a Top Cow character
 Sabreclaw, a Marvel Comics MC2 character
 Silverclaw, a Marvel Comics character
 Steel Claw, a British comic character
 Steelclaw, a DC Comics character
 Yellow Claw (comics), a Marvel Comics character

See also
Claw (disambiguation)

References